Steven Armstrong (born 12 January 1984) is a former Australian rules footballer in the Australian Football League and current coach of the Subiaco Lions colts team. He has played for the Melbourne Football Club and the 2006 West Coast Eagles premiership team.

He was injured in the 2002 Bali bombings, and bears a scar on his leg from this incident.

Football career
Drafted in the 2001 AFL Draft at pick 25 in the second round, Armstrong made his debut for Melbourne in 2002. He was known for his tenacity around the ball and being a team player. However, after being omitted from the starting line-up several times (playing only 12 games between 2004–2005), he was delisted at the end of the 2005 season.

In 2006 he was thrown a lifeline by the West Coast Eagles by being added to their rookie list. He finally made his debut for the Eagles in round 13 against the Western Bulldogs where he was one of the Eagles' best players for the match. Despite only having 15 disposals for the match, his ferocity on and off the ball was recognised. With tough competition in the Eagles lineup, he was dropped the next week. He made a return in round 17 in the Eagles' 82 point win over minor premiers Adelaide, kicking three goals. Armstrong was selected for the first match of the 2006 finals after kicking four goals the week before. He played in the 2006 AFL Grand Final, and kicked the Eagles' penultimate goal in the final quarter to help his team win by one point.

In 2007, Armstrong had an indifferent season. He started off the season in fine fashion, impressing as a small forward, a position the club has struggled to fill since the departure of Phil Matera in 2005, including a three-goal performance in the round 3 Western Derby against Fremantle. However, one sub-par performance in the club's first loss of the season against Geelong in round 7, saw him lose his place in the team. He was brought back in as a replacement as early as round 9 against Hawthorn, however struggled to cement a regular spot in the team, only filling in for injuries and spent the rest of the season playing for Perth in the West Australian Football League (WAFL).

He played 14 games for the Eagles in the disappointing 2008 season. He was delisted by the club at the end of the season.

In 2009, Armstrong was signed to play full-time for Perth Demons in the WAFL.

In late 2011, after a career spanning 10 seasons, Armstrong announced that he was retiring from football to concentrate on his coaching career. He previously held the position of Claremont League Assistant.

Statistics

|- style="background-color: #EAEAEA"
! scope="row" style="text-align:center"|2002
|style="text-align:center;"|
|2||13||7||4||74||59||133||37||23|| 0.5||0.3||5.7||4.5||10.2||2.8||1.8
|-
!scope="row" style="text-align:center" | 2003
|style="text-align:center;"|
|2||18||8||7||120||111||231||57||43||0.4||0.4||6.7||6.2||12.8||3.2||2.4
|- style="background:#eaeaea;"
!scope="row" style="text-align:center"|2004
|style="text-align:center;"|
|2||6||4||2||39||20||59||10||14||0.7||0.3||6.5||3.3||9.8||1.7||2.3
|-
!scope="row" style="text-align:center"|2005
|style="text-align:center;"|
|2||6||2||0||26||13||39||10||19||0.3||0.0||4.3||2.2||6.5||1.7||3.2
|- style="background:#eaeaea;"
! scope="row" style="text-align:center"|2006
|style="text-align:center;"|
|35||10||10||9||73||62||135||39||15||1.0||0.9||7.3||6.2||13.5||3.9||1.5
|-
! scope="row" style="text-align:center"|2007
|style="text-align:center;"|
|35||12||8||10||96||71||167||38||28||0.7||0.8||8.0||5.9||13.9||3.2||2.3
|- style="background:#eaeaea;"
! scope="row" style="text-align:center"|2008
|style="text-align:center;"|
|35||14||9||11||107||109||216||55||43||0.6||0.8||7.6||7.8||15.4||3.9||3.1
|- class="sortbottom"
! colspan=3| Career
!79
!48
!43
!535
!445
!980
!246
!185
!0.6
!0.5
!6.8
!5.6
!12.4
!3.1
!2.3
|}

References

External links

DemonWiki profile

1984 births
Living people
Melbourne Football Club players
West Coast Eagles players
West Coast Eagles Premiership players
Australian rules footballers from Western Australia
Perth Football Club players
Sandringham Football Club players
One-time VFL/AFL Premiership players